Rudolf Otto von Ottenfeld (21 July 1856, Verona – 26 July 1913, Prague) was an Austrian military painter, a founding member of the Vienna Secession and a professor at the Academy of Fine Arts, Prague.

Life 

Ottenfeld was a student at the Academy of Fine Arts, Vienna under Carl Wurzinger and Leopold Carl Müller. He lived in Munich in 1883–93 and Vienna in 1893–1900. For the Sixth International Art Exhibition in Munich in 1892, he was selected as a juror. Ottenfeld's illustrations in a history of the Austrian army between 1700 and 1867 in 1895, which became a standard reference work on uniforms in the period.

He was a founding member of the Vienna Secession and sat on the Secession's working committee. The title page of the fourth issue of Ver Sacrum, the official journal of the Secession, was designed by Ottenfeld. After the death of Julius Mařák in 1899, Ottenfeld was appointed to the Academy of Fine Arts, Prague. Among his students in Prague was the painter and art restorer Zdeněk Glückselig.  He spent thirteen years there as a professor, until his death.

Style 

Ottenfeld was noted as a creator of military art in Vienna. He painted several battle scenes, as well as soldiers in uniform, with a historical context.

Awards 
 Lesser Gold Medal, Third International Art Exhibition in Vienna, 1894
 Lesser Gold Medal, International Art Exhibition in Berlin, 1896
 Second Class Medal, Antwerp, 1894 World Exhibition

Selected exhibitions 
 Christmas Exhibition in Vienna, 1891, Montenegrins in Flight
 Third International Art Exhibition in Vienna, 1894, Archduke Charles allows the transfer of the corpse of the French General Marçeau to the French forces (21 September 1796).
 Exhibition of the Graz Künstlerbund, 1904.

Selected works 
 A glorious chapter for the Austrian artillery. The army artillery reserve after the battle of Hradec Králové on the 3rd of July 1866. Oil on canvas, 1897, 194 x 289 cm, Museum of Military History, Vienna.
 Occupation campaign in Bosnia in 1878. Austrian troops cross a pass in Bosnia. Oil on wood, 1878, Museum of Military History, Vienna.
 Grenzer sniper and infantry in 1798. Oil on cardboard, 1896, Museum of Military History, Vienna.

See also
List of Orientalist artists
Orientalism

Bibliography

References

External links 

1856 births
1913 deaths
Art Nouveau painters
Academic staff of the Academy of Fine Arts, Prague
Academy of Fine Arts Vienna alumni
Austrian painters
Austrian male painters
Members of the Vienna Secession
Orientalist painters
Painters from Verona